District 5 is a district in the Texas House of Representatives that, following 2021 redistricting, encompasses all of Camp, Morris, Rains, Titus, Upshur, and Wood Counties, and part of Smith County. The district is currently represented by Republican Cole Hefner.

List of representatives

References

005